Roberto Donoso-Barros (October 5, 1921 – August 2, 1975) was a Chilean botanist, naturalist, and herpetologist.

Early life and education 
Donoso-Barros was born in Santiago, Chile. He attended the University of Chile in Santiago, earning his M.D. from the school in 1947.

Career 
Donoso-Barros joined the faculty of the University of Chile in 1954. In 1965, he became a professor at the University of Concepción. He also worked at the Universidad de Oriente in Venezuela, and at the Smithsonian Institution in the United States.

Donoso-Barros was a prolific herpetological authority in Chile. In 1966, he published Reptiles de Chile which collected and reported on all lizard species described to date in Chile.

Species described by Donoso-Barros include:

 Garthia penai (Donoso-Barros, 1966)
 Liolaemus brattstroemi Donoso-Barros, 1961 – synonym of Liolaemus pictus
 Liolaemus ceii Donoso-Barros, 1971 – synonym of Liolaemus kriegi
 Liolaemus constanzae Donoso-Barros, 1961
 Liolaemus hellmichi Donoso-Barros, 1974
 Liolaemus paulinae Donoso-Barros, 1961
 Liolaemus sarmientoi Donoso-Barros, 1973
Gonatodes ceciliae Donoso-Barros, 1966
 Microlophus atacamensis (Donoso-Barros, 1966)
 Microlophus tarapacensis (Donoso-Barros, 1966)
Bachia marcelae Donoso-Barros & Garrido, 1964
Alsodes vanzolinii (Donoso-Barros, 1974)
 Pristidactylus alvaroi (Donoso-Barros, 1974)
 Pristidactylus valeriae (Donoso-Barros, 1974)

Nota bene: A binomial authority in parentheses indicates that the species was originally described in a different genus.

Accolades 
Donoso-Barros was awarded the Abate Molina Prize by the Chilean Academy of Sciences in 1966. He was also awarded the Atenea Award in 1966 for Reptiles de Chile.

A proposed subspecies of Chelonoidis chilensis, C. chilensis donosobarrosi, is named for Donoso-Barros. A species of lizard, Liolaemus donosobarrosi, is named after him.

Personal life 
Donoso-Barros had four daughters and one son. His children were the source of some of the specific epithets for species he described, including Gonatodes ceciliae, named for his daughter Cecilia; Liolaemus paulinae, named for his daughter Pauline; Pristidactylus valeriae, named for his daughter Valeria; Liolaemus constanzae, named for his daughter Constanza; and Pristidactylus alvaroi, named for his son Álvaro.

Donoso-Barros died on August 2, 1975, as a result of a traffic accident.

References 

20th-century Chilean botanists
Chilean herpetologists
Smithsonian Institution people
Chilean naturalists
1921 births
1975 deaths
Chilean expatriates in Venezuela
Chilean expatriates in the United States